Hampshire Mall is a primarily one-story shopping mall with a small second floor in Hadley, Massachusetts, United States, with approximately 30 stores owned by The Pyramid Companies. Current anchor stores include  Dick's Sporting Goods, JCPenney, PetSmart and Target. The mall is home to Interskate 91 North, a roller skating rink on the second floor. Attached to the skating rink is LaserBlast: Ancient Adventure (a Lasertag facility that was formerly home to LaserStorm).

History
When the mall opened in 1978 it was anchored by JCPenney, Steiger's and Kmart.

The Steiger's store was demolished in 1994 for Media Play. The Media Play store opened August 10, 1995. Kmart closed in 2002 because of the chain's bankruptcy. In 2003 the former Kmart space was rebuilt and extended to house a Target store. Originally the mall contained a six screen movie theater that existed from 1978 to 1999. This was then expanded to a 12-screen Cinemark movie theater in 2000.

A  Dick's Sporting Goods store opened in early 2005, replacing a former Eastern Mountain Sports. Best Buy and Steve & Barry's replaced Media Play in early 2005. Steve & Barry's filed for Chapter 11 bankruptcy in 2008 and subsequently closed their Hampshire Mall store in August 2008 and it was replaced by the racetrack.

Walmart developers beginning in 2005 wished to build a new  Supercenter southeast of Hampshire Mall. After two years of negotiations, on November 20, 2007, a subdivision plan that exempted the planned Walmart Supercenter from the current bylaw restrictions was approved. Developers have eight years to get a site plan approved before the exemption expires. This would almost certainly mean the current store, attached to the east end of Mountain Farms Mall, would close.

Road access to the mall

The state of Massachusetts is considering widening Route 9 to two lanes in each direction from Middle Street to the mall area to alleviate frequent traffic jams. This would add to a previous project completed in 2008 that widened Route 9 from the Calvin Coolidge Bridge in Northampton and result in two lanes in each direction from Northampton through Hadley to the Amherst line. This would also enable easier access to Mountain Farms mall and the new Hadley Corner shops.

See also 
 Mountain Farms Mall—across the street and competing with the Hampshire Mall

References

External links
 Official website

Buildings and structures in Hadley, Massachusetts
The Pyramid Companies
Shopping malls established in 1978
Shopping malls in Massachusetts
Tourist attractions in Hampshire County, Massachusetts